Opacibidion rugicolle is a species of beetle in the family Cerambycidae. It was described by Nonfried in 1895.

References

Neoibidionini
Beetles described in 1895